The National Democratic Labour Action Society – Wa'ad is Bahrain's largest leftist political party.

History and profile
It emerged from the Popular Front, a "radical" clandestine opposition movement of socialist and Arab nationalist orientation. Under the reform process initiated by Bahrain's King Hamad, the leaders of the Popular Front returned from exile to participate in the political process through the National Democratic Labour Action (NDLA).

The NDLA's leaders supported Beijing during the 1960s Left-Left split in the Arab world between the pro-Moscow camp and the pro-China camp. The party is the first licensed political group in any of the Arab states of the Persian Gulf.

Historically, the Left in Bahrain had been very strong, partly as a result of the creation of a local working class through the Kingdom's industrialisation with the discovery of oil in the 1930s; however the waning of Arab nationalism, the collapse of communism as an ideology and the rise of the Islamist Right have marginalised the NDLA and robbed it of much of its traditional support. The party was established by returning exiles in 2002.

The current leader of the party is Fouad Seyadi, who was elected after the general assembly of the party in November 2016. One of the current known figures of the party is Ibrahim Sharif Al-Sayed, who took over in 2005 until 2012 from Abdul-Rahman Al Nuaimi. In 2005 the party renamed itself Wa'ad, which translates to "Promise". Other prominent members include: Abdul-Nabi Alekri, Ebrahim KamalAldeen, Sami Seyadi, Ali Salih and Munira Fakhro

The party suffered a very disappointing result in 2002's municipal elections when none of its candidates were elected in any constituency. Despite this, the NDLA's leaders are widely respected and retain a great deal of influence in Bahraini society. The party boycotted 2002's parliamentary elections, but took part in the Bahraini parliamentary election of 2006; among its candidates was its vice president and former Harvard academic, Munira Fakhro, who contested an Isa Town constituency against Salah Ali of Al-Menbar Islamic Society.

In June 2017, the party was banned on terrorism charges. The ban was criticised by Amnesty International and Bahrain Institute for Rights and Democracy. Lynn Maalouf of Amnesty International stated that "the suspension of Waad is a flagrant attack on freedom of expression and association".

Organizational structure

The Highest Authority of Wa'ad is its General Assembly which all Wa'ad active members has the right to attend, which hold its meetings every 2 years. The General Assembly elects a Central Committee which holds the legislative power until the next General assembly. The Central Committee elects in its first meeting a General Secretary and a political bureau which act as governing body for the party until the next General Assembly.

See also
 Popular Front for the Liberation of Bahrain
 National Liberation Front – Bahrain
 Progressive Democratic Tribune
 Ibrahim Sharif
 Munira Fakhro
 Bahrain election 2006 women candidates

References

External links
National Democratic Action 
List of Central Committee members, 2006 (from Gulf Daily News)
'Few political societies try to bridge gap between Sunnis and Shiites', Gulf News, 4 October 2006

2002 establishments in Bahrain
Arab nationalism in Bahrain
Arab Nationalist Movement breakaway groups
Arab nationalist political parties
Bahraini uprising of 2011
Banned socialist parties
Organizations of the Arab Spring
Political parties established in 2002
Political parties in Bahrain
Socialist parties in Bahrain